Runeberg torte is a Finnish torte flavored with almonds and arrack or rum and weighing about 100 grams. It usually has raspberry jam encircled by a ring of icing on top.

The torte is named after the Finnish poet Johan Ludvig Runeberg (1804–1877) who, according to legend, regularly enjoyed the torte, made by his wife, with punsch for breakfast. Runeberg tortes are typically eaten only in Finland and are generally available in stores from the beginning of January to Runeberg's birthday on February 5; however, Porvoo, where Runeberg lived for most of his life, is an exception, as in some of its cafés tortes are available every day of the year.

History 
 
Popular legend says that Runeberg's wife, Fredrika Runeberg, created the dessert. Her recipe book from the 1850s has a recipe for the torte, believed to be a variation of an earlier recipe by confectioner Lars Astenius from Porvoo.

References

External links 

Finnish desserts
Cakes
Almond desserts
es:Johan Ludvig Runeberg#Tarta de Runeberg